Dissinger is a surname. Notable people with the surname include:

Christian Dissinger (born 1991), German handball player

German-language surnames